Memury  is a village in Kottayam district in the Indian state of Kerala.

Demographics
 India census, Memury had a population of 10189 with 5150 males and 5039 females.

Notable people
Cyriac K. Pullapilly,  a well-known theologian and historian, was raised in Memury. He later traveled to the United States, received his Ph.D. from the University of Chicago. He wrote over twenty historical books in English and in Malayalam.

References

Villages in Kottayam district